Yelena Shvaybovich (born 3 February 1966 in Minsk, Byelorussian SSR) is a Belarusian former basketball player who competed in the 1992 Summer Olympics. She also won EuroBasket 1989 Women as a member of Soviet Union women's national basketball team.

References

1966 births
Basketball players from Minsk
Living people
Belarusian women's basketball players
Olympic basketball players of the Unified Team
Basketball players at the 1992 Summer Olympics
Olympic gold medalists for the Unified Team
Olympic medalists in basketball
Soviet women's basketball players
Medalists at the 1992 Summer Olympics
Honoured Masters of Sport of the USSR
Belarusian expatriate basketball people in Poland
Belarusian expatriate basketball people in Russia
FIBA EuroBasket-winning players